Nuestra Señora Reina de los Angeles, as the name of a mission, may refer to:
 Nuestra Señora Reina de los Ángeles Asistencia in Los Angeles
 Mission Nuestra Señora de los Ángeles de Porciúncula de los Pecos in Pecos, New Mexico
 La Iglesia de Nuestra Señora la Reina de los Ángeles, La Placita church in Los Angeles
 El Rio de Nuestra Señora La Reina de Los Angeles de Porciúncula, the Los Angeles River